Michalina Olszańska (born 29 June 1992) is a Polish actress and writer. She is a daughter of actors Agnieszka Fatyga and Wojciech Olszański. She has published two novels as a teenager.

For her role in I, Olga Hepnarová she received the Minsk International Film Festival Award for best leading actress in 2016 and the Czech Film Critics' Award for best actress in 2017.

Michalina has starred in the Netflix original Polish-language series 1983, playing the role of Ofelia "Effy" Ibrom. The series premiered worldwide on 30 November 2018.

Films (partial list)
The Occupation (2019) - Nadya
Sobibor (2018) - Hanna
Clash of Futures (German: Krieg der Träume) (2018) - Pola Negri
Carga (2018) - Viktoriya / Alanna
Matilda (2017) - Mathilde Kschessinska
I, Olga Hepnarová (2016) - Olga Hepnarová
Anatomia Zla (2015) - Halina
The Lure (2015) - Golden
Warsaw 44 (2014) - dancer
Jack Strong (2014) - Iza

Series

Books

References

External links
 Netflix first Polish original series launches November 30th, 2018.
 Olszańska
 

1992 births
Polish film actresses
Polish television actresses
Living people
Actresses from Warsaw
Czech Lion Awards winners